The Lurie Prize in Biomedical Sciences recognizes outstanding achievement by a promising young scientist in biomedical research. It is awarded annually by the Foundation for the National Institutes of Health. 

Established in 2013 the award is worth $100,000 and was made possible by the gift of FNIH board member Ann Lurie. Prizewinners are selected by a jury of six distinguished biomedical researchers from a list of nominations.

Recipients
Source: FNIH
 2022: Anne Brunet, Andrew Dillin 
2021: Xiaowei Zhuang
2020: Aviv Regev
2019: Yasmine Belkaid
2018: Zhijian “James” Chen
2017: David M. Sabatini
2016: Jeannie T. Lee
2015: Karl Deisseroth
2014: Jennifer Doudna
2013: Ruslan M. Medzhitov

See also

 List of biomedical science awards

References

Biomedical awards
American science and technology awards
Awards established in 2013